The economy of Israel is a highly developed free-market economy. The prosperity of Israel's advanced economy allows the country to have a sophisticated welfare state, a powerful modern military said to possess a nuclear-weapons capability with a full nuclear triad, modern infrastructure rivaling many Western countries, and a high-technology sector competitively on par with Silicon Valley. It has the second-largest number of startup companies in the world after the United States, and the third-largest number of NASDAQ-listed companies after the U.S. and China. American companies such as Intel, Microsoft, and Apple built their first overseas research and development facilities in Israel. Other high-tech multi-national corporations, such as IBM, Google, Hewlett-Packard, Cisco Systems, Facebook and Motorola have opened R&D centers in the country.

The country's major economic sectors are high-technology and industrial manufacturing. The Israeli diamond industry is one of the world's centers for diamond cutting and polishing, amounting to 23.2% of all exports. As the country is relatively poor in natural resources, it consequently depends on imports of petroleum, raw materials, wheat, motor vehicles, uncut diamonds and production inputs. Nonetheless, the country's nearly total reliance on energy imports may change in the future as recent discoveries of natural gas reserves off its coast and the Israeli solar energy industry have taken a leading role in Israel's energy sector.

Israel's quality higher education and the establishment of a highly motivated and educated populace is largely responsible for ushering in the country's high technology boom and rapid economic development by regional standards. The country has developed a strong educational infrastructure, and a high-quality incubation system for new cutting edge ideas to create value driven goods and services. These developments have allowed the country to create a high concentration of high-tech companies across the country's regions. These companies are financially backed by a strong venture capital industry. Its central high technology hub, the "Silicon Wadi", is considered second in importance only to its Californian counterpart. Numerous Israeli companies have been acquired by global corporations for their reliable and quality corporate personnel.

In its early decades, the Israeli economy was largely state-controlled and shaped by social democratic ideas. In the 1970s and 1980s, the economy underwent a series of free-market reforms and was gradually liberalized. In the past three decades, the economy has grown considerably, though GDP per capita has increased faster than wages. Israel is the most developed and advanced country in Western Asia, possessing the highest average wealth per adult in the Middle East and the 17th largest foreign-exchange reserves in the world. In recent years Israel has had the highest growth rate in the Western world along with Ireland. The Economist ranked Israel as the 4th most successful economy among the developed countries for 2022. The IMF estimated Israel's GDP at US$564 billion and its GDP per capita at US$58,270 in 2023, a figure comparable to other highly developed and rich countries. Israel was invited to join the OECD in 2010. Israel has also signed free trade agreements with the European Union, the United States, the European Free Trade Association, Turkey, Mexico, Canada, Ukraine, Jordan, and Egypt. In 2007 Israel became the first non-Latin-American country to sign a free trade agreement with the Mercosur trade bloc.

History

The British Mandate for Palestine that came into effect in 1920 aimed at restricting land purchases by Jewish immigrants. For this reason, the Jewish population was initially more urban and had a higher share in industrial occupations. This particular development resulted economically in one of the few growth miracles of the region whereby the structure of firms was determined mainly by private entrepreneurs rather than by the government.
The first survey of the Dead Sea in 1911, by the Russian Jewish engineer Moshe Novomeysky, led to the establishment of Palestine Potash Ltd. in 1930, later renamed the Dead Sea Works. In 1923, Pinhas Rutenberg was granted an exclusive concession for the production and distribution of electric power. He founded the Palestine Electric Company, later the Israel Electric Corporation.  Between 1920 and 1924, some of the country's largest factories were established, including the Shemen Oil Company, the Societe des Grand Moulins, the Palestine Silicate Company and the Palestine Salt Company.

In 1937, there were 86 spinning and weaving factories in the country, employing a workforce of 1,500. Capital and technical expertise were supplied by Jewish professionals from Europe. The Ata textile plant in Kiryat Ata, which went on to become an icon of the Israeli textile industry, was established in 1934. In 1939, the cornerstone was laid for one of the kibbutz industry's first factories: the Naaman brick factory, which supplied the growing need for construction materials.

The textile underwent rapid development during World War II, when supplies from Europe were cut off while local manufacturers were commissioned for army needs. By 1943, the number of factories had grown to 250, with a workforce of 5,630, and output increased tenfold.

From 1924, trade fairs were held in Tel Aviv. The Levant Fair was inaugurated in 1932.

After independence
After statehood, Israel faced a deep economic crisis. As well as having to recover from the devastating effects of the 1948 Arab–Israeli War, it also had to absorb hundreds of thousands of Jewish refugees from Europe and almost a million from the Arab world. Israel was financially overwhelmed and faced a deep economic crisis, which led to a policy of austerity from 1949 to 1959. Unemployment was high, and foreign currency reserves were scarce.

In 1952, Israel and West Germany signed an agreement stipulating that West Germany was to pay Israel for the persecution of Jews during the Holocaust, and compensate for Jewish property stolen by the Nazis. Over the next 14 years, West Germany paid Israel 3 billion marks (equivalent to US$111.5bn in modern currency). The reparations became a decisive part of Israel's income, comprising as high as 87.5% of Israel's income in 1956. In 1950, the Israeli government launched Israel Bonds for American and Canadian Jews to buy. In 1951, the final results of the bonds program exceeded $52 million. Additionally, many American Jews made private donations to Israel, which in 1956 were thought to amount to $100 million a year. In 1957, bond sales amounted to 35% of Israel's special development budget. Later in the century, Israel became significantly reliant on economic aid from the United States, a country that also became Israel's most important source of political support internationally.

The proceeds from these sources were invested in industrial and agricultural development projects, which allowed Israel to become economically self-sufficient. Among the projects made possible by the aid was the Hadera power plant, the Dead Sea Works, the National Water Carrier, port development in Haifa, Ashdod, and Eilat, desalination plants, and national infrastructure projects.

After statehood, priority was given to establishing industries in areas slated for development, among them, Lachish, Ashkelon, the Negev and Galilee. The expansion of Israel's textile industry was a consequence of the development of cotton growing as a profitable agricultural branch. By the late 1960s, textiles were one of the largest industrial branches in Israel, second only to the foodstuff industry. Textiles constituted about 12% of industrial exports, becoming the second-largest export branch after polished diamonds. In the 1990s, cheap East Asian labor decreased the profitability of the sector. Much of the work was subcontracted to 400 Israeli Arab sewing shops. As these closed down, Israeli firms, among them Delta, Polgat, Argeman and Kitan, began doing their sewing work in Jordan and Egypt, usually under the QIZ arrangement. In the early 2000s, Israeli companies had 30 plants in Jordan. Israeli exports reached $370 million a year, supplying such retailers and designers as Marks & Spencer, The Gap, Victoria's Secret, Walmart, Sears, Ralph Lauren, Calvin Klein, and Donna Karan.

In its first two decades of existence, Israel's strong commitment to development led to economic growth rates that exceeded 10% annually. Between 1950 and 1963, the expenditure among wage-earner's families rose 97% in real terms. Between 1955 and 1966, per capita consumption rose by 221%. The years after the 1973 Yom Kippur War were a lost decade economically, as growth stalled, inflation soared and government expenditures rose significantly. Also worthy of mention is the 1983 Bank stock crisis. By 1984, the economic situation became almost catastrophic with inflation reaching an annual rate close to 450% and projected to reach over 1000% by the end of the following year. However, the successful economic stabilization plan implemented in 1985 and the subsequent introduction of market-oriented structural reforms reinvigorated the economy and paved the way for its rapid growth in the 1990s and became a model for other countries facing similar economic crises.

Two developments have helped to transform Israel's economy since the beginning of the 1990s. The first is waves of Jewish immigration, predominantly from the countries of the former USSR, that has brought over one million new citizens to Israel. These new Soviet Jewish immigrants, many of them highly educated, had a wellspring of scientific and technical expertise to help spur Israel's burgeoning technology sector, now constitute some 15% of Israel's population. The second development benefiting the Israeli economy is the peace process that begun at the Madrid conference of October 1991, which led to the signing of accords and later to a peace treaty between Israel and Jordan (1994).

In the early 2000s, the Israeli economy went into a downturn due to the crashing of the global dot-com bubble which bankrupted many startups established during the height of the bubble. The Second Intifada, which cost Israel billions of dollars in security costs, and a decline in investment and tourism, sent unemployment in Israel to the double digits; growth in one quarter of 2000 was 10%. In 2002, the Israeli economy declined about 4% in one quarter.  Afterward, Israel managed to create a remarkable recovery by opening up new markets to Israeli exporters farther afield, such as in the rapidly growing countries of East Asia. This was possible thanks to a rebound in the Israeli tech sector, spurred on by the gradual bottoming out of the dotcom crash and a growing increase in demand for computer software, which in turn was due to burgeoning rates of global internet usage at this time. The explosion in demand for security and defense products following 9/11 also allowed Israel to sell even more of its technologies abroad - a situation only made possible due to Israel’s prior investments in the technology sector in an effort to curb high levels of domestic unemployment.

In the 2000s, there was an influx of foreign investment in Israel from companies that formerly shunned the Israeli market. In 2006, foreign investment in Israel totalled $13 billion, according to the Manufacturers Association of Israel. The Financial Times said that "bombs drop, yet Israel's economy grows". Moreover, while Israel's total gross external debt is US$95 billion, or approximately 41.6% of GDP, since 2001 it has become a net lender nation in terms of net external debt (the total value of assets vs. liabilities in debt instruments owed abroad), which  stood at a significant surplus of US$60 billion. The country also maintains a current account surplus in an amount equivalent to about 3% of its gross domestic product in 2010.

The Israeli economy withstood the late-2000s recession, registering positive GDP growth in 2009 and ending the decade with an unemployment rate lower than that of many western countries. There are several reasons behind this economic resilience, for example, the fact that the country is a net lender rather than a borrower nation and the government and the Bank of Israel's generally conservative macro-economic policies. Two policies, in particular, can be cited, one is the refusal of the government to succumb to pressure by the banks to appropriate large sums of public money to aid them early in the crisis, thus limiting their risky behavior. The second is the implementation of the recommendations of the Bach'ar commission in the early to mid-2000s which recommended decoupling the banks' depository- and Investment banking activities, contrary to the then-opposite trend, particularly in the United States, of easing such restrictions which had the effect of encouraging more risk-taking in the financial systems of those countries.

OECD membership
In May 2007, Israel was invited to open accession discussions with the OECD. In May 2010, the OECD voted unanimously to invite Israel to join, despite Palestinian objections. It became a full member on 7 September 2010. The OECD praised Israel's scientific and technological progress and described it as having "produced outstanding outcomes on a world scale."

Challenges
Despite economic prosperity, the Israeli economy faces many challenges, some are short term and some are long term challenges. On the short term its inability to duplicate its success in the telecommunication industry into other growing industries hampers its economic outlooks. Its inability to foster large multinational companies in the last decade also calls into question its ability to employ large numbers of people in advanced industries. On the long term, Israel is facing challenges of high dependency of the growing number of Ultra-Orthodox Jews who have a low level of official labor force participation amongst men, and this situation could lead to a materially lower employment-to-population ratio and a higher dependency ratio in the future. The governor of the Bank of Israel, Stanley Fischer, stated that the growing poverty amongst the Ultra-Orthodox is hurting the Israeli economy. According to the data published by Ian Fursman, 60% of the poor households in Israel are of the Haredi Jews and the Israeli Arabs. Both groups together represent 25–28% of the Israeli population.  Organizations such as The Kemach Foundation, Gvahim, Jerusalem Village and The Jerusalem Business Networking Forum are addressing these challenges with job placement services and networking events.

Data 
The following table shows the main economic indicators in 1980–2021 (with IMF staff estimates in 2022–2027). Inflation under 5% is in green.

Sectors

Agriculture

In 2017, 2.4% of the country's GDP is derived from agriculture. Of a total labor force of 2.7 million, 2.6% are employed in agricultural production while 6.3% in services for agriculture. While Israel imports substantial quantities of grain (approximately 80% of local consumption), it is largely self-sufficient in other agricultural products and foodstuffs. For centuries, farmers of the region have grown varieties of citrus fruits, such as grapefruit, oranges and lemons. Citrus fruits are still Israel's major agricultural export. In addition, Israel is one of the world's leading greenhouse-food-exporting countries. Israel also produces and exports flowers and cotton. The country exports more than $1.3 billion worth of agricultural products every year, including farm produce as well as $1.2 billion worth of agricultural inputs and technology.

Financial services

Israel has over 100 active venture capital funds operating throughout the country with US$10 billion under management. In 2004, international foreign funds from various nations around the world committed over 50 percent of the total dollars invested exemplifying the country's strong and sound reputation as an internationally sought after foreign investment by many countries.  Israel's venture capital sector has rapidly developed from the early 1990s, and has about 70 active venture capital funds (VC), of which 14 international VCs have Israeli offices. Israel's thriving venture capital and business-incubator industry played an important role in financing the country's flourishing high-tech sector. In 2008, venture capital investment in Israel, rose 19 percent to $1.9 billion.

"Between 1991 and 2000, Israel's annual venture-capital outlays, nearly all private, rose nearly 60-fold, from $58 million to $3.3 billion; companies launched by Israeli venture funds rose from 100 to 800; and Israel's information-technology revenues rose from $1.6 billion to $12.5 billion. By 1999, Israel ranked second only to the United States in invested private-equity capital as a share of GDP. Israel led the world in the share of its growth attributable to high-tech ventures: 70 percent."

Israel's thriving venture capital industry has played an important role in funding the country's booming high-technology sector, with hundreds of prosperous Israeli private equity and venture capital firms. The financial crisis of 2007–08 negatively affected the availability of venture capital locally. In 2009, there were 63 mergers and acquisitions in the Israeli market worth a total of $2.54 billion; 7% below 2008 levels ($2.74 billion), when 82 Israeli companies were merged or acquired, and 33% lower than 2007 proceeds ($3.79 billion) when 87 Israeli companies were merged or acquired. Numerous Israeli high tech companies have been acquired by global corporations for its reliable corporate management and quality personnel. In addition to venture capital funds, many of the world's leading investment banks, pension funds, and insurance companies have a strong presence in Israel committing their funds to financially back Israeli high-tech firms and benefit from its prosperous high tech sector. These institutional investors include Goldman Sachs, Bear Stearns, Deutsche Bank, JP Morgan, Credit Suisse First Boston, Merrill Lynch, CalPERS, Ontario Teachers Pension Plan, and AIG.

Israel also has a small but fast growing hedge fund industry. Within five years between 2007 and 2012, the number of active hedge funds doubled to 60. Israel-based hedge funds have registered an increase of 162% from 2006 to 2012, when they managed a total of $2 billion (₪8 billion) and employed about 300 people. The ever-growing hedge fund industry in Israel is also attracting a myriad of investors from around the world, particularly from the United States.

High technology

Science and technology in Israel is one of the country's most highly developed and industrialized sectors. The modern Israeli ecosystem of high technology is highly optimized making up a significant bulk of the Israeli economy. The percentage of Israelis engaged in scientific and technological inquiry, and the amount spent on research and development (R&D) concerning gross domestic product (GDP), is among the highest in the world, with 140 scientists and technicians per 10,000 employees. In comparison, the same is 85 per 10,000 in the United States and 83 per 10,000 in Japan. Israel ranks fourth in the world in scientific activity, as measured by the number of scientific publications per million citizens. Israel's percentage of the total number of scientific articles published worldwide is almost 10 times higher than its percentage of the world's population. The country is home to over 1,400 life science companies, including about 300 pharmaceutical companies, 600 medical device companies, 450 digital health companies, and 468 biotechnology companies. Israeli scientists, engineers, and technicians have contributed to the modern advancement of the natural sciences, agricultural sciences, computer sciences, electronics, genetics, medicine, optics, solar energy and various fields of engineering. The country has one of the world's technologically most literate populations. Israel has the second largest number of startup companies globally, behind only the United States, and remains one of the largest centers in the world for technology start-up enterprises. As of 2013, around 200 start-ups were being created annually in Israel. In 2019, there were nearly 7,000 active start-ups in the country. In 2021, there were 79 Israeli-founded tech unicorns, 32 of them headquartered in Israel. More than one-third of cybersecurity unicorns in the world were Israeli in 2021. Israel is also home to nearly 400 research and development centers owned by multinational companies, including giants such as Google, Microsoft, and Intel.

Israel is a major semiconductor design hub. It is home to numerous chip design centers owned by major multinational corporations, and is considered as having one of the most advanced chip design industries in the world. In 2021, a total of 37 multinational firms were operating in Israel in the semiconductor field.

In 1998, Tel Aviv was named by Newsweek as one of the ten technologically most influential cities in the world. In 2012, the city was also named one of the best places for high-tech startup companies, placed second behind its California counterpart.
In 2013, The Boston Globe ranked Tel Aviv as the second-best city for business start-ups, after Silicon Valley. In 2020, StartupBlink ranked Israel as having the third best startup ecosystem in the world, behind only the United States and United Kingdom.

As a result of the country's highly renowned and creative start-up culture, Israel is often referred to as the Start-Up Nation (adapted from the book Start-Up Nation, by Dan Senor and Saul Singer) and the "Silicon Valley of the Middle East". Programs that send people to Israel to explore the "Start-Up Nation" economy include TAVtech Ventures and TAMID Group. This success has been attributed by some to widespread service in the Israel Defense Forces and its development of talent which then fuels the high-tech industry upon discharge.

In recent years, the industry has faced a shortage of technology specialists; 15% of positions in the high technology sector of Israel were unfilled as of 2019. However, the largest number of unfilled positions (31%) are in software engineering specialities: DevOps, back-end, data science, machine learning and artificial intelligence. Therefore, salaries of specialists in the Israeli market also increased significantly. To solve this problem, IT companies look for filling the gaps abroad. Consequently, they employ about 25% of their entire workforce overseas. Most companies choose to hire employees from Ukraine (45%) and the United States (with 16%) are the second most popular offshoring destination country. In 2017, the Council for Higher Education in Israel launched a five-year program to increase the number of graduates from computer science and engineering programs by 40%.

Energy

Historically, Israel relied on external imports for meeting most of its energy needs, spending an amount equivalent to over 5% of its GDP per year in 2009 on imports of energy products. The transportation sector relies mainly on gasoline and diesel fuel, while the majority of electricity production is generated using imported coal. As of 2013, Israel was importing about 100 mln barrels of oil per year. The country possesses negligible reserves of crude oil but does have domestic natural gas resources which were discovered in more significant quantities starting in 2009, after many decades of previously unsuccessful exploration.

Natural gas

Until the early 2000s, natural gas use in Israel was minimal. In the late 1990s, the government of Israel decided to encourage the usage of natural gas because of environmental, cost, and resource diversification reasons. At the time however, there were no domestic sources of natural gas and the expectation was that gas would be supplied from overseas in the form of LNG and by a future pipeline from Egypt (which eventually became the Arish–Ashkelon pipeline). Plans were made for the Israel Electric Corporation to construct several natural gas-driven power plants, for erecting a national gas distribution grid, and for an LNG import terminal.

Recent discoveries 
In 2000, a 33-billion-cubic-metre (BCM), or 1,200-billion-cubic-foot, the natural-gas field was located offshore Ashkelon, with commercial production starting in 2004.  however, this field is nearly depleted—earlier than expected due to increased pumping to partially compensate for the loss of imported Egyptian gas in the wake of unrest associated with the fall of the Mubarak regime in 2011. Furthermore, results of 3D seismic surveys and test drilling conducted since 2010 have confirmed that an estimated 621 BCM natural-gas deposit named Leviathan exists in a large underwater geological formation nearby the large gas field already discovered in 2009.

The Tamar field began commercial production on 30 March 2013 after four years of development. The supply of gas from Tamar was expected to aid the Israeli economy, which had suffered losses of more than ₪20 billion between 2011 and 2013 resulting from the disruption of gas supplies from neighboring Egypt (and which are not expected to resume due to Egypt's decision to indefinitely suspend its gas supply agreement to Israel). As a result, Israel, as well as its other neighbor Jordan, which also suffered from disruption of gas deliveries from Egypt, had to resort to importing significantly more expensive and polluting liquid heavy fuels as substitute sources of energy. The ensuing energy crisis in Israel was lifted once the Tamar field came online in 2013, while Jordan committed to a US$10 billion, 15-year gas supply deal totaling 45 BCM from the Israeli Leviathan field which is scheduled to come online in late 2019. The agreement is estimated to save Jordan US$600 million per year in energy costs. In 2018, the owners of the Tamar and Leviathan fields announced that they are negotiating an agreement with a consortium of Egyptian firms for the supply of up to 64 BCM of gas over 10 years valued at up to US$15 billion.  In early 2012 the Israeli cabinet announced plans to set up a sovereign wealth fund (called "the Israeli Citizens' Fund").

Electricity

Since the founding of the state through the mid-2010s decade, the state-owned utility, Israel Electric Corporation (IEC) had an effective monopoly on power generation in the country. In 2010 the company sold 52,037 GWh of electricity. Until the mid-2010s the country also faced a persistently low operating reserve, which is mostly the result of Israel being an "electricity island". Most countries have the capability of relying on power drawn from producers in adjacent countries in the event of a power shortage. Israel's grid however, is unconnected to those of neighboring countries. This is mostly due to political reasons but also to the considerably less-developed nature of the power systems of Jordan and Egypt, whose systems constantly struggle to meet domestic demand and whose per-capita electric generation is less than one fifth that of Israel's. Nevertheless, while operating reserves in Israel were low, the country possessed sufficient generation and transmission capacity to meet domestic electricity needs and unlike in the countries surrounding it, rolling blackouts have historically been quite rare, even at periods of extreme demand.

Facing the increasing demand for electricity and concerned about the low reserve situation, the government of Israel began taking steps to increase the supply of electricity and operating reserve, as well to reduce the monopoly position of the IEC and increase competition in the electricity market starting in the second half of the 2000s decade. It instructed the IEC to construct several new power stations and encouraged private investment in the generation sector. By 2015, the IEC's share of total nationwide installed electric generation capacity had fallen to about 75%, with the company then possessing an installed generation capacity of about 13.6 gigawatts (GW). Since 2010, Independent Power Producers have constructed three new gas-fired combined cycle power stations with a total generation capacity of about 2.2 GW, while various industrial concerns constructed on-premises cogeneration facilities with a total electricity output of about 1 GW, and which are licensed by the electric authority to sell surplus electricity to the national grid at competitive rates. Also under construction is a 300 MW pumped storage facility, with two more in planning, plus several solar-powered plants.

In addition to the above steps, Israel and Cyprus are considering implementing the proposed EuroAsia Interconnector project. This consists of laying a 2000MW HVDC undersea power cable between them and between Cyprus and Greece, thus connecting Israel to the greater European power grid. If carried out, this will allow a further increase in the country's operating reserve as well as sell surplus electricity abroad.

In 2016, total nationwide electricity production was 67.2 GWh, of which 55.2% was generated using natural gas and 43.8% using coal — the first time the share of electricity production using natural gas exceeded that generated using coal.

Solar power

Solar power in Israel and the Israeli solar energy industry has a history that dates to the founding of the country. In the 1950s, Levi Yissar developed a solar water heater to help assuage an energy shortage in the new country. By 1967 around one in twenty households heated their water with the sun and 50,000 solar heaters had been sold. With the 1970s oil crisis, Harry Zvi Tabor, the father of Israel's solar industry, developed the prototype solar water heater that is now used in over 90% of Israeli homes.

Industrial manufacturing
Israel has a large industrial capacity. It has a well-developed chemical industry with many of its products aimed at the export market. Most of the chemical plants are located in Ramat Hovav, the Haifa Bay area and near the Dead Sea. Israel Chemicals is one of the largest fertilizer and chemical companies in Israel and its subsidiary, the Dead Sea Works in Sdom is the world's fourth-largest producer and supplier of potash products. The company also produces other products such as magnesium chloride, industrial salts, de-icers, bath salts, table salt, and raw materials for the cosmetic industry. Industrial production of metals, machinery and electrical equipment, construction materials, consumer goods, and textiles, as well as food processing also form a significant part of the manufacturing sector. Machinery and equipment manufactured in Israel includes computer equipment, medical equipment, agricultural equipment, and robots. Israel has a successful semiconductor device fabrication industry, with several semiconductor manufacturing facilities in the country.

One of the country's largest employers is Israel Aerospace Industries which produces mainly aviation, space, and defense products. In 2017 the company had an order backlog of 11.4 billion US dollars. There are numerous other aerospace companies. Israeli aerospace companies are primarily sub-suppliers, focusing on fields such as machining, electronic systems and components, and composite materials. Israel is a major manufacturer and exporter of unmanned aerial vehicles. Israel also has a significant pharmaceutical industry and is home to Teva Pharmaceutical Industries, one of the world's largest pharmaceutical companies, which employed 40,000 people as of 2011. It specializes in generic and proprietary pharmaceuticals and active pharmaceutical ingredients. It is the largest generic drug manufacturer in the world and one of the 15 largest pharmaceutical companies worldwide. In addition, Israel also has a shipbuilding industry through the company Israel Shipyards, which has one of the largest shipbuilding and repair facilities in the Eastern Mediterranean. For the civilian market, it builds merchant ships and other civilian watercraft as well as machinery for ports and heavy industries. It also builds naval craft for the defense market.

Diamond industry

Israel is one of the world's three major centers for polished diamonds, alongside Belgium and India. Israel's net polished diamond exports slid 22.8 percent in 2012 as polished diamond exports fell to $5.56 billion from $7.2 billion in 2011. Net exports of rough diamonds dropped 20.1 percent to $2.8 billion and net exports of polished diamonds slipped 24.9 percent to $4.3 billion, while net rough diamond imports dropped 12.9 percent to $3.8 billion. Net exports and imports have dropped due to the ongoing Global financial crisis, particularly within the Eurozone and the United States. The United States is the largest market accounting for 36% of overall export market for polished diamonds while Hong Kong remains at second with 28 percent and Belgium at 8 percent coming in third. , cut diamonds were Israel's largest export product, comprising 23.2% of all exports.

Defense contracting

Israel is one of the world's major exporters of military equipment, accounting for 10% of the world total in 2007. Three Israeli companies were listed on the 2010 Stockholm International Peace Research Institute index of the world's top 100 arms-producing and military service companies: Elbit Systems, Israel Aerospace Industries and RAFAEL. The Defense industry in Israel is a strategically important sector and a large employer within the country. It is also a major player in the global arms market and is the 11th largest arms exporter in the world as of 2012. Total arms transfer agreements topped 12.9 billion between 2004 and 2011. There are over 150 active defense companies based in the country with combined revenues of more than US$3.5 billion annually. Israeli defense equipment exports have reached 7 billion U.S. dollars in 2012, making it a 20 percent increase from the amount of defense-related exports in 2011. Much of the exports are sold to the United States and Europe. Other major regions that purchase Israeli defense equipment include Southeast Asia and Latin America. India is also major country for Israeli arms exports and has remained Israel's largest arms market in the world. Israel is considered to be the leading UAV exporter in the world. According to the Stockholm International Peace Research Institute, Israeli defense companies were behind 41% of all drones exported in 2001–2011. Israel's defense exports in 2021 reached US$11.2 billion in sales. Exports to Arab countries that joined the Abraham Accords made up 7% of all Israeli defense exports.

Tourism

Israel is a major tourist destination, especially for those of Jewish ancestry, with 4.55 million foreign tourists visiting the country in 2019 (about one tourist per two Israelis), yielding a 25% growth since 2016 and contributed ₪20 billion to the economy, making it an all-time record at that time. The most popular paid visited site is Masada.

External trade

In 2016, Israeli goods exports totaled US$55.8 billion. It imported US$61.9 billion worth of goods in the same year. In 2017 total exports (goods and services) amounted to US$102.3 billion, while imports totaled $96.7 billion.
Israel usually posts a modest trade deficit in goods. Its main goods imports consist of raw materials, crude oil, production inputs and finished consumer goods. Most of its exports are high-value-added items such as electronic components and other high-technology equipment, tools, and machinery, cut diamonds, refined petrochemicals, and pharmaceuticals. It normally posts a substantial trade surplus in services thanks to tourism and service industries such as software development, engineering services, and biomedical and scientific research and development. Therefore, overall external trade is positive, contributing to a significant current account surplus which as of 2017 stood at 4.7% of GDP.

The United States is Israel's largest trading partner, and Israel is the United States' 26th-largest trading partner; two-way trade totaled some $24.5 billion in 2010, up from $12.7 billion in 1997. The principal U.S. exports to Israel include computers, integrated circuits, aircraft parts and other defense equipment, wheat, and automobiles. Israel's chief exports to the U.S. include cut diamonds, jewelry, integrated circuits, printing machinery, and telecommunications equipment. The two countries signed a free trade agreement (FTA) in 1985 that progressively eliminated tariffs on most goods traded between the two countries over the following ten years. An agricultural trade accord was signed in November 1996, which addressed the remaining goods not covered in the FTA. Some non-tariff barriers and tariffs on goods remain, however. Israel also has trade and cooperation agreements in place with the European Union and Canada, and is seeking to conclude such agreements with a number of other countries, including Turkey, Jordan and several countries in Eastern Europe.

In regional terms, the European Union is the top destination for Israeli exports. In the four-month period between October 2011 and January 2012, Israel exported goods totalling $5 billion to the EU – amounting to 35% of Israel's overall exports. During the same period, Israeli exports to East Asia and the Far East totaled some $3.1 billion.

Until 1995, Israel's trade with the Arab world was minimal due to the Arab League boycott, which was begun against the Jewish community of Palestine in 1945. Arab nations not only refused to have direct trade with Israel (the primary boycott), but they also refused to do business with any corporation that operated in Israel (secondary boycott), or any corporation that did business with a corporation that did business with Israel (tertiary boycott).

In 2013, commercial trade between Israel and the Palestinian territories were valued at US$20 billion annually.

In 2012, ten companies were responsible for 47.7% of Israel's exports. These companies were Intel Israel, Elbit Systems, Oil Refineries Ltd, Teva Pharmaceuticals, Iscar, Israel Chemicals, Makhteshim Agan, Paz Oil Company, Israel Aerospace Industries and the Indigo division of Hewlett-Packard. The Bank of Israel and Israel's Export Institute have warned that the country is too dependent on a small number of exporters.

Export destinations and import origins

Rankings

The Global Competitiveness Report of 2016 to 2017 ranked Israel as having the world's second most innovative economy. It was also ranked 19th among 189 world nations on the UN's Human Development Index. As of 2018, Israel ranks 20th out of 133 countries on the economic complexity index. The IMD World Competitiveness Yearbook of 2016 ranked Israel's economy as world 21st most competitive out of the 61 economies surveyed. The Israeli economy was ranked as the world's most durable economy in the face of crises, and was also ranked first in the rate research and development center investments. The Bank of Israel was ranked first among central banks for its efficient functioning, up from the 8th place in 2009. Israel was ranked first also in its supply of skilled manpower. Israeli companies, particularly in the high-tech area, have enjoyed considerable success raising money on Wall Street and other world financial markets:  Israel ranked second among foreign countries in the number of its companies listed on U.S. stock exchanges.

Having moved away from the socialist economic model since the mid-1980s and early 1990s, Israel has made dramatic moves toward the free-market capitalist paradigm. , Israel's economic freedom score is 74.0, making its economy the 26th freest in the 2020 Index of Economic Freedom. Israel ranks 35th on the World Bank's ease of doing business index.  Israel's economic competitiveness is helped by strong protection of property rights, relatively low corruption levels, and high openness to global trade and investment. Income and corporate tax rates remain relatively high. , Israel ranks 35th out of 179 countries in Transparency International's Corruption Perceptions Index. Bribery and other forms of corruption are illegal in Israel, which is a signatory to the OECD Bribery Convention since 2008.

See also

 Economy of the Middle East
 Energy Triangle
 List of companies of Israel
 List of largest companies in Israel
 Ministry of Finance (Israel)
 Privatization in Israel
 Silicon Wadi
 Start-up Nation
 Standard of living in Israel
 Taxation in Israel
 Tel Aviv Stock Exchange
 Telecommunications in Israel
 Trajtenberg Committee
 Transport in Israel

References

Further reading
 Argov, Eyal. "The Development of Education in Israel and its Contribution to Long-Term Growth" (No. 2016.15. Bank of Israel, 2016) online .
 Shalev, Michael. Labour and the Political Economy in Israel. Oxford: Oxford University Press, 1992.
 Ben-Porath, Yoram ed. The Israeli Economy: Maturing through Crises. Cambridge, MA: Harvard University Press, 1986.
 Chill, Dan. The Arab Boycott of Israel: Economic Aggression and World Reaction. New York: Praeger, 1976.
 Kanovsky, Eliyahu. The Economy of the Israeli Kibbutz. Cambridge, MA: Harvard University Press, 1966.
 Klein, Michael. A Gemara of the Israel Economy. Cambridge, MA: National Bureau of Economic Research, 2005.
 Michaely, Michael. Foreign Trade Regimes and Economic Development: Israel. New York: National Bureau of Economic Research, 1975.
 
 .
 Senor, Dan and Singer, Saul, Start-up Nation: The Story of Israel's Economic Miracle, Hachette, New York (2009) 
 Rubner, Alex. The Economy of Israel: A Critical Account of the First Ten Years. New York: Frederick A Praeger, 1960.
 .
 Maman, Daniel and Rosenhek, Zeev. The Israeli Central Bank: Political Economy: Global Logics & Local Actors. Routledge, 2011.
 The Global Political Economy of Israel

External links

 .
 Israel. The World Factbook. Central Intelligence Agency.
  Israel and the IMF, International Monetary Fund
 World Bank Trade Summary Statistics Israel 2012
 .
 .
 
 Tariffs applied by Israel as provided by ITC's ITC Market Access Map, an online database of customs tariffs and market requirements
 Investigative Dashboard List of Israel Company Registries
 Hebrew documents about the recession in Israel 1966-1967:
 ישראל - הסיפור המתועד: "האחרון שיוצא שיכבה את האור" - 50 שנה למיתון 1966 - 1967

 
Israel
Israel